Anna Margareta von Haugwitz (16 January 1622 in Calbe (Saale) – 20 March 1673 in Stockholm), was a German noble, married to the Swedish count, statesman and military commander Carl Gustaf Wrangel.

Life 
Anna Margareta von Haugwitz was a daughter of Baltzar Joachim von Haugwitz and his wife, Sophie von Weltheim. Soon after her birth, both of her parents died.

As a poor orphan from the untitled lower German nobility she, as a ward of the German Countess Elisabeth Juliane of Erbach (who married the Swedish commander Johan Banér in 1636), met Carl Gustaf Wrangel in the Swedish military camp. The couple fell in love and married for love in 1640, which was unusual and controversial and aroused attention – Wrangel was a member of the most powerful Swedish nobility and his family disproved because she was of the untitled nobility as well as poor. The relationship between the couple was described as happy. After the Thirty Years' War, she lived mainly at the estates of Wrangel in Swedish Pomerania. At her death, she provided a sum of money to her birth city of Calbe, to be handed out every year at the date of her birth.

External links
Archive of Anna Margareta von Haugwitz – Lebengeschichte (in German).

References

Svante Norrhem (2007). Kvinnor vid maktens sida 1632–1772. Falun: Nordic Academic Press. 
Englund, Peter (1997). Ofredsår (3. uppl.). Stockholm: Atlantis. Libris 8374708. 
Losman, Arne (1996). Ansikten: Matthaeus Merian den yngres porträtt på Skokloster. Skokloster-studier, 0586-6154 ; 30. Bålsta: Skoklosters slott. Libris 8383859. 

1622 births
1673 deaths
People from Calbe
Swedish countesses
Swedish people of German descent
Swedish people of the Thirty Years' War
German untitled nobility
German people of the Thirty Years' War
17th-century German people
People of the Swedish Empire
17th-century Swedish nobility